The 1960 Wake Forest Demon Deacons football team was an American football team that represented Wake Forest University during the 1960 NCAA University Division football season. In its first season under head coach Bill Hildebrand, the team compiled a 2–8 record and finished in seventh place in the Atlantic Coast Conference (ACC).

Quarterback Norm Snead was selected by the United Press International as a first-team player on the 1960 All-Atlantic Coast Conference football team. Snead later played 16 seasons in the NFL and was a four-time All-Pro selection.

Schedule

Team leaders

References

Wake Forest
Wake Forest Demon Deacons football seasons
Wake Forest Demon Deacons football